WWF WrestleMania 2000 is a professional wrestling video game released in 1999 on the Nintendo 64 (N64) console. It was based on the World Wrestling Federation's (WWF) annual pay-per-view, WrestleMania. Despite the fact that this game is based upon WrestleMania 2000, the game was released five months prior (and four months prior on the Game Boy Color) to the actual PPV itself, therefore resulting in the game using the stage design from the 1999 event, WrestleMania XV, instead. Released at the height of the WWF's Attitude Era, WrestleMania 2000 was the first WWF game released by THQ. The wrestling company ended its long relationship with Acclaim Entertainment after witnessing the video game success of its competitor, World Championship Wrestling (WCW), on behalf of THQ. WrestleMania 2000 shares its game engine with the Japan-only release Virtual Pro Wrestling 2: Ōdō Keishō.

The game would be succeeded by WWF No Mercy in 2000.

Gameplay
WWF WrestleMania 2000 uses the exact same game engine previously seen in WCW/nWo Revenge, which released the previous year. More than 50 WWF wrestlers were included in the game, and, with the exception of existing superstars' move sets, all of them can be freely edited to the player's liking. Using the same system, the Create-a-Wrestler mode is extensive. Players are able to create a highly detailed wrestler with an extensive library of wrestling moves, many of which are carried over from previous AKI games in the series. Usual WWF modes such as Royal Rumble and King of the Ring modes are included, along with a pay-per-view mode, enabling the player to either recreate or create unique pay-per-views with television-style features. Players can also create up to eight championship belts and put them up for contest in Exhibition mode.

The "Road To WrestleMania" mode places the player on the long road to WWF glory. Starting out as a rookie, the player gradually works their way up the ladder and earns opportunities to gain various WWF titles, win various tournaments, be challenged by various wrestlers and ultimately main-event at WrestleMania 2000. Although the story mode is long and extensive in the number of matches in which it pits the player, there are no branching storylines and if the player loses a match, it is simply recorded as a loss in their win–loss record. Throughout the mode, when the player wins a championship, they are expected to defend their title in future in-game pay-per-view events. This rule applies to all championships that the player currently holds. For example, if one holds the WWF European Championship, WWF Intercontinental Championship, WWF Tag Team Championship, and the WWF Championship, the player must defend all four titles during one single pay-per-view event.

There are often feuds at different parts in the storyline, occasionally with one wrestler calling out another wrestler in the ring. Also, feuding wrestlers often interrupt matches, helping the opponent. However, the season continues whether or not the player wins or loses their matches. If the player progresses through a winning season with a created wrestler and then starts a new season as a new created wrestler, the first character will still be used in season mode.

Features

The game features several arenas at which WWF held events in 1998 and 1999. There are also arenas based on each WWF television show, such as Sunday Night Heat, Raw is War, as well as other pay-per-view venues of the time.

This was the first WWF game to allow players to freely edit their favorite superstars (i.e. putting Stone Cold Steve Austin in The Rock's trunks) and also be able to create and modify alternate attires for each wrestler, as each character in the game has four templates that can be individually edited and switched between using the left and right 'C' buttons. If the player makes changes that they do not like, a default button resets the edited costume into the original costume for that slot. It was also the first THQ produced Nintendo 64 title to feature a "Create a Wrestler" mode.

In addition to the numerous default and secret characters, several other realistic likenesses and movesets in the create-a-wrestler mode make it possible to add even more characters. Some examples include The Road Warriors, Hulk Hogan, Taka Michinoku, and Davey Boy Smith. Also, some taunts and move sets were carried over from WCW/nWo Revenge, allowing the player to create and include WCW wrestlers such as Goldberg, Kevin Nash, Scott Hall, Diamond Dallas Page, and Macho Man Randy Savage. The drawback to the create-a-wrestler mode, however, is the fact that there are limited slots available due to limited memory space, but players can edit the individual templates in the character models to include four different characters with separate appearances which allows a great deal of flexibility. However, wrestlers in the same template are forced to have the same moves.

Additionally, by making two superstars' entrance music the same, if they are a real-life tag team they will be introduced as such; for instance, matching the Road Dogg and Mr. Ass's themes would lead to them being introduced together as The New Age Outlaws before a tag team match.

Also, some features are implemented in the game that were not seen in WCW/nWo Revenge, such as a Cage Match and a First Blood mode. Reversals and counter moves were also expanded upon and made much more commonplace.

A normally unselectable Computer Intelligence mode can also be accessed using a GameShark code, as well as WCW and nWo ring aprons.

This game's roster is notable compared to both the preceding WWF Attitude and its successor WWF SmackDown!. It is the only THQ WWF game where Droz, Chaz (Mosh), Thrasher and Jeff Jarrett are playable, due to Droz suffering a career-ending injury and the remaining names leaving the company the same year. It is also the only game in which where Scott Taylor and Brian Christopher are featured in their earlier "Too Much" gimmick, as well as the only game where Shawn Stasiak's short-lived gimmick as "Meat" is playable (he would soon after leave for WCW and return to the company following the company's purchase in 2001). It is one of only two games in which Michael Hayes is playable (the other being WCW Wrestling from a decade prior). In addition, one of The Godfather's Hos is a playable character despite not being a wrestler.

Signature taunts
In WWF WrestleMania 2000, many players have their signature taunts, such as Stone Cold Steve Austin flipping off an opponent or Mr. Ass mooning another wrestler. Also, by pressing in a different direction on the joystick, a different taunt is performed. Rotating the joystick counter clock wise results in the player mimicking his opponent's taunt.

Roster

Male wrestlers

Al Snow
Big Bossman
Big Show
Bradshaw
Brian Christopher
Chaz
Chris Jericho
Christian
D'Lo Brown
Droz
Edge
Farooq
Gangrel
Gerald Brisco
Godfather
Hardcore Holly
Jeff Hardy
Jeff Jarrett
Kane
Ken Shamrock
Mankind
Mark Henry
Matt Hardy
Meat
Michael Hayes
Mideon
Mr. Ass
Mr. McMahon
Pat Patterson
Prince Albert
Road Dogg
Scotty 2 Hotty
Shane McMahon
Steve Austin
Steve Blackman
Test
The Blue Meanie
The Rock
Thrasher
Triple H
The Undertaker
Val Venis
Viscera
X-Pac

Female wrestlers
Chyna
Debra
Ivory
Jacqueline
Terri Runnels
Tori

Unlockables
All characters are unlocked by playing the "Road to WrestleMania" mode:

Cactus Jack - Defend the Hardcore Title 3 times
Dude Love - Win the King of the Ring tournament and the win the WWF Title at SummerSlam
Jerry "The King" Lawler - At the beginning of WrestleMania alongside Jim Ross
Jim Ross - At the beginning of WrestleMania alongside Jerry "The King" Lawler
Paul Bearer - Play one month as The Undertaker
Shawn Michaels - Win the WWF title match at WrestleMania and he will challenge you to a match 
Stephanie McMahon - Play one month as Test

Advertising and release
In a TV commercial promoting the game, The Rock becomes furious at how the game includes his name, likeness, and move-set. At the end of the ad, he threatens to shove copies of the game up Santa Claus's "candy-ass".

Some copies of WWF WrestleMania 2000 shipped with a special card containing four holograms of the in game action, such as a wrestler's entrance or finishing move.

Reception

The N64 version of the game received "favorable" reviews, while the Game Boy Color version received "mixed" reviews, according to video game review aggregator GameRankings. Daniel Erickson of NextGen said of the former console version: "Wonderful gameplay even overshadows the lack of quality audio." Stuart Clarke of The Sydney Morning Herald said of the same console version: "The strong gameplay will even appeal to non-wrestling fans and with up to four people able to fight simultaneously it's sure to be a popular party game." In Japan, Famitsu gave the same console version a score of 28 out of 40.

In one GamePro review, The Enforcer called the Nintendo 64 version "the best wrestling title this year. [...] The king of the ring has arrived." In another review, The D-Pad Destroyer called it "a very fun game, especially for four players, and its ease of play will endear it to hardcore wrestling fans who don't want to spend months studying a list of moves. It may be new, and it may have the WWF, but in the end, it's just the revenge of Revenge."

In the final edition of Nintendo Power, WWF WrestleMania 2000 was ranked number 223 in a list of the best games released on Nintendo consoles, namely for its massive roster and positive gameplay ability. The game sold more than one million units by January 2000.

The Nintendo 64 version was a finalist for the "Console Fighting Game of the Year" award at the Academy of Interactive Arts & Sciences' 3rd Annual Interactive Achievement Awards, which went to Soulcalibur.

See also

Virtual Pro Wrestling
List of licensed wrestling video games
List of fighting games

Notes

References

External links

1999 video games
Asmik Ace Entertainment games
Game Boy Color games
Natsume (company) games
Nintendo 64 games
Professional wrestling games
Sports video games with career mode
Syn Sophia games
THQ games
Video games developed in Japan
Video games scored by Iku Mizutani
WrestleMania video games
WWE video games